Vallikattu Dayara, a monastery of the Indian Orthodox Church founded by Pulikkottil Joseph Mar Dionysious II in 1868.

History
A parish church is built in 2 . of land in Ayanattukunnil, Vakathanam that was received on lease from the Travancore government in 1868. Fr.Kalapurackal Paulose, and Pazhiattungal Geevarghese were the people who supervised the construction of the Church. Fr. Kalapurackal built a two-storeyed building for the Church.

In 1908 Ramban Geevarghese Karuchira resided in the Church complex and developed it into a dayara. He was later elevated to bishophood and assumed the name Geevarghese Mar Phelexinose. From 1913 to 1925 dayara became the Headquarters of the Diocese of Kottayam.

In the year 1925 he was elevated to Catholicos of the East, assuming the title Baselios Geevarghese I, and the dayara became the Headquarters of the Catholicos of the East.

Tombs
In 1928 Baselios Geevarghese I, Catholicos of the East, also known as (Vallikattu Bava), was buried in Vallikattu Dayara.

Baselios Mar Thoma Mathews I Catholicos renovated the Vallikattu Dayara in 1982; it became an important centre of pilgrimage.

15 August (Shunoyo Feast) and 17 December (anniversary of Baselios Geevarghese I) are the important feast days for the Dayara.

Former metropolitan of Idukki , H.G. Thazhamon Ougen Mar Dionysius is also entombed here . Annual Memorial feast is conducted .

See also
 Malankara Orthodox Syrian Church
 Baselios Geevarghese I

References

Malankara Orthodox Syrian church buildings
Oriental Orthodox monasteries in India
19th-century Christian monasteries
1868 establishments in India
Religious organizations established in 1868
19th-century churches in India